Big Iron is a western ballad by Marty Robbins, released in 1960.

Big Iron may also refer to:
 Mainframe computer, a large, powerful computer
 Big Iron River, a river in Ontonagon County, Michigan
 Big Iron (album), an album by Carol Noonan
 "Big Iron", an episode of Knight Rider

See also 
 Big Iron Farm Show in West Fargo, North Dakota, USA
 Big Iron World, a 2006 album by Old Crow Medicine Show